The 1st Armoured Division was an armoured division of the British Army and formed in 1937. The division was commanded by a general officer commanding (GOC), who received orders from a level above him in the chain of command, and then used the forces within the division to undertake the mission assigned. In addition to directing the tactical battle in which the division was involved, the GOC oversaw a staff and the administrative, logistical, medical, training, and discipline concerns of the division. From its founding to being disbanded in 1945, the division had eight permanent GOCs. An additional GOC commanded a new 1st Armoured Division that was formed during the 1946–1947 period.

On 24 November 1937, after several years of debate on such a formation, the division was founded as the Mobile Division. It was then renamed, in April 1939, as the 1st Armoured Division. Following the start of the Second World War, subordinate units and formations were withdrawn from the division to reinforce others. It was eventually deployed for combat, in May 1940, when it was dispatched to France and subsequently fought in the Battle of France before being withdrawn back to the UK in June during Operation Aerial. In late 1941, the division was sent to North Africa where it took part in the Western Desert campaign, notably fighting at the Battle of Gazala, and the First and the Second Battles of El Alamein. During 1942, Major-General Herbert Lumsden was wounded in action twice while leading the division, and Major-General Alexander Gatehouse was wounded once.

The division then fought in the Tunisian campaign until the Axis defeat in North Africa in May 1943. It was during this period that it was temporarily renamed the 1st British Armoured Division, to avoid it being confused with the American 1st Armored Division that was also fighting in the campaign. With the conclusion of fighting in Tunisia, the division remained in North Africa until 1944. In May 1944, it started to move to Italy to fight in the Italian campaign. Between late August and the end of September, the division fought in several engagements as part of the Allied assault on the German Gothic Line. Due to a manpower crisis within the British Army, the division was chosen to be broken up to provide reinforcements for other formations to attempt to keep them at full strength. In October 1944, the division relinquished command of its final troops and ceased to be an operational formation. It was then officially disbanded on 11 January 1945. In 1946, in the post-war years, the 6th Armoured Division was redesignated as the 1st Armoured Division. It undertook occupational duties in Italy, before it was transferred to Palestine and disbanded in 1947.

General officer commanding

Notes

References

 
 
 
 
 
 
 
 
 
 
 
 

British Army personnel by war
British Army personnel of World War II
British Army general officer commanding lists